North Rode is a small village and civil parish in the unitary authority of Cheshire East and the ceremonial county of Cheshire, England. According to the 2001 census, the population of the entire civil parish was 178.

History 
North Rode was originally a township in Prestbury ancient parish, and it was also part of Macclesfield Hundred. In the nineteenth century, it was also placed in  Macclesfield poor law union and rural sanitary district. In 1866, it was placed in Macclesfield rural district, and at the same time it became a separate civil parish. There was a small change to the boundary of the civil parish in 1936.

The picturesque church is dedicated to St Michael and was built 1845–6. At that time North Rode became a separate ecclesiastical parish in Macclesfield rural deanery. In 1873 it was assigned to Macclesfield  South rural deanery, and in 1880, it reassigned back into the re-established Macclesfield deanery. The church is part of a combined benefice with Gawsworth, sharing the Rt Reverend William A Pwaisiho OBE, Hon. Assistant Bishop of Chester, as Rector.

North Rode's parliamentary representation, after the Great Reform Act of 1832 began with it being in the Cheshire Northern Division parliamentary constituency. In 1867 until 1885, it was placed in the Cheshire North Division parliamentary constituency, and from 1885 until 1948 it was in the Knutsford Division parliamentary constituency. Since 1948 it has been in Macclesfield County Constituency.

The village hall is known as Daintry Hall and is occupied by a children's day nursery.

The West Coast Main Line crosses the River Dane on a 20-arch viaduct and then runs parallel with the Macclesfield Canal to the east of the village; until it was closed in the 1960s, a branch of the North Staffordshire Railway from Uttoxeter joined the main line here.

See also

Listed buildings in North Rode

Notes and references

Notes

Bibliography

External links

Villages in Cheshire
Civil parishes in Cheshire